Iiro Viinanen (born 27 September 1944, in Kuopio, Finland) is a Finnish politician. Viinanen graduated as an engineer from a Tampere institute in 1967 and as a M.Sc. Tech. from Helsinki University of Technology in 1974 . He was a Member of the Finnish Parliament (Eduskunta / Riksdagen) from 1983 to 1996. His political party was National Coalition Party. He served as the Minister of Finance from 1991 to 1996. 

During his term as a minister, Finland went through its worst recession in history. As the Minister of Finance in Prime Minister Esko Aho's cabinet he led strict budget discipline. He stated that unless budget is cut, Finland can no longer borrow money from foreign countries. Reactions towards his actions caused either strong approval or strong disapproval. Some felt he saved the treasury and some felt he ruined the Finnish welfare state.

In 1996 he was appointed CEO of Pohjola Insurance. At the end of the 1990s he was a board member of Nokia, Kone, UPM-Kymmene, YIT, Finnair, and Orion. He served as a vice chairman of Nokia from 1996 to 2000.

He was diagnosed with Parkinson's disease in 2000, forcing him to retire.

References 

1944 births
Living people
People from Kuopio
National Coalition Party politicians
Ministers of Finance of Finland
Members of the Parliament of Finland (1983–87)
Members of the Parliament of Finland (1987–91)
Members of the Parliament of Finland (1991–95)
Members of the Parliament of Finland (1995–99) 
Nokia people
People with Parkinson's disease